The military history of Catalonia began in the thirteenth century, with the first exploits of the armies under the orders of Catalan rulers and lasting until today, where Catalan soldiers are integrated into international forces.

Origins 

The origins of military force in the Catalonia date back to the thirteenth century, with the Sagramental, the brotherhood among several peoples to guarantee their own security, made by oath, and, therefore, called this way. Though they were institutionalised during the reign of James I, they had already been legislated in writing during the 11th century. In Catalonia, the usage Princeps namque established the requirement that every man participate in the national defense in the event of external threat.

The history of the Mediterranean has often tasted Catalan weapons, from Murcia to Athens and Neopatria (Great Catalan Company), but also to old Catalonia, before and after the Nueva Planta decrees (1716).

The Catalans, Aragonese and Valencians have been organized spontaneously militarily in many different ways, from the Sagramental, the Crusades of the Almogavars to the maulets, the submissive ones, or the maquis. Until the Nueva Planta decrees, in Catalan homes there were always weapons and ammunition to defend themselves, either from the Saracens, the pirates or the French.
 
It is not therefore until after the defeat of the War of the Spanish Succession that the new Bourbon authorities limited and controlled the right to bear arms, and under the pretext of pacifying the country, it hides the desire to prevent citizens from rising in Weapons against it, as had happened many times.

In addition, the Catalan constitutions, abolished in fact by the Decree, forced the Crown to negotiate the popular support, represented by the arm seal (an institution that convened the Provincial Council of the General in an extraordinary way in cases of emergency or urgency) of the catalan courts, support that they often granted in exchange for privileges, which limited the royal authority. This balance of powers disappears after the defeat, and humiliation becomes apparent in many ways, such as the demolition of La Ribera quarter, where there was more resistance, the construction of the fortress of the Ciutadella in the same place, the imposition of the Cadastre, or the closure of all Catalan universities.

For this reason, when they saw the difference of the concept of royal authority in Castile, the Catalans rose up with Charles VI, Holy Roman Emperor, handed out posters of propaganda and negotiated with England.

The Abandonment of the Allies of Catalonia in the war of Spanish succession "Treaty of utrecht" supposed the Victory of the Bourbon monarchy Support with Castille versus Habsburg Support with Aragon Crown: (Principality Of Catalonia, The Kingdom of Aragon, Kingdom of Valencia and Kingdom of Mallorca) that Centralized power and eliminated rights and freedoms of the nations surrounding the Castille Nation with New Plant Decree.

The deplorable History of The catalans written by Queen Anne of England or  document of several European foreign ministries reflect that abandonment.

The Crown of Aragon has been considered an empire  which ruled in the Mediterranean for hundreds of years, with the power to set rules over the entire sea(for instance, the Llibre del Consolat del Mar or Book of the Consulate of the Sea, written in Catalan, is one of the oldest compilation of maritime laws in the world). It was indeed, at its height, one of the major powers in Europe.

Military Objects and Constructions

Anti-aircraft missile test
(Belmonte Aerial Torpedo ) 1937

Bombarda
Bombarda The bombard, considered the oldest portable firearm, was a primitive artillery piece precursor to the cannon The first use in combat documented in the Crown of Aragon was in 1359 during the War of the Two Peters (1356–1375) in the naval battle of Barcelona when the troops of Peter IV of Aragon fired a bombardment of which he had mounted on the Catalan galleys, making useless one of the attacking galleys and destroying the castles and the tree.

«	...e la nostra nau desparà una bombarda e ferí en lo castell de la nau de Castella...	»
— Cròniques dels reis d'Aragó e comtes de Barcelona

Maritime

Catalan Galley

The Catalan Galley (formerly Galea) has its own entity with respect to the galleys of other maritime nations (referenced since the 13th century), since Coromines contributes a reference of a Catalan galley of the year 1120 (100 years before the others). I t was a type of warship and commerce, powered entirely by the force of the oars and sometimes by the wind, thanks to the presence of trees with their sails (usually Latin).

At least as of the 12th century, the Catalans built the "galeras catalanes", making extensive use for the war tasks with the different maritime republics (as enemies or as allies) or for commerce with the majority of ports of the Mediterranean, guaranteeing the commercial routes with the consulates of Catalans. Its use began to decline as of the XVII century, when they were gradually replaced by sailboats, extinct itself definitively at the end of the XVIII century.

Guns and Arms
Pistols:
Pistol isard

Submachine guns:

Submachine Labora-fontbernat

Assault rifles:

Shotguns:

Sniper rifles:

Heavy weapons:
Hispano Suiza Hs.404

Portal: Military History of Catalonia
Miilitary Portal Catalonia in English: https://ja.cat/07yXi

Read more:

Great Catalan Company

Reaper's War 
Battle of Montjuïc

War of the Spanish Succession 
Army of the Principality of Catalonia

Spanish Civil War 

People's Army of Catalonia
Regiment Pirinenc Núm. 1

References